is a railway station in Hamakita-ku, Hamamatsu,  Shizuoka Prefecture, Japan, operated by the third sector Tenryū Hamanako Railroad.

Lines
Gansuiji Station is served by the Tenryū Hamanako Line, and is located 30.3 kilometers from the starting point of the line at Kakegawa Station.

Station layout
The station has one side platform serving a single bi-directional track with a  small station building. The station is unattended. The station building and platform are protected as Registered Tangible Cultural Properties of Japan since 2011.

Adjacent stations

|-
!colspan=5|Tenryū Hamanako Railroad

Station History
Gansuiji Station was established on June 1, 1940 when the section of the Japan National Railways Futamata Line was extended from Enshū-Mori Station to Kanasashi Station. Small parcel services were discontinued from June 1970, and the station was unmanned after that time. Freight services were discontinued in April 1973. After the privatization of JNR on March 15, 1987, the station came under the control of the Tenryū Hamanako Line.

Passenger statistics
In fiscal 2016, the station was used by an average of 38 passengers daily (boarding passengers only).

Surrounding area
Gansu-ji

See also
 List of Railway Stations in Japan

References

External links

  Tenryū Hamanako Railroad Station information 
 

Railway stations in Shizuoka Prefecture
Railway stations in Japan opened in 1940
Stations of Tenryū Hamanako Railroad
Railway stations in Hamamatsu